Pseudoteyl is a genus of spiders in the family Nemesiidae. It was first described in 1985 by Main. , it contains only one species, Pseudoteyl vancouveri, found in Australia.

References

Nemesiidae
Monotypic Mygalomorphae genera
Spiders of Australia